The 1990 Eastern Michigan Hurons football team represented Eastern Michigan University in the 1990 NCAA Division I-A football season. In their eighth season under head coach Jim Harkema, the Hurons compiled a 2–9 record (2–6 against conference opponents), finished in a tie for seventh place in the Mid-American Conference, and were outscored by their opponents, 301 to 179. The team's statistical leaders included Shane Jackson with 1,454 passing yards, Ed Nwagbaraocha with 402 rushing yards, and Todd Bell with 400 receiving yards.

Schedule

References

Eastern Michigan
Eastern Michigan Eagles football seasons
Eastern Michigan Hurons football